Adrianus "Adri" van Male (7 October 1910, in Philippine – 11 October 1990) was a Dutch football goalkeeper.

He played 221 matches for Feyenoord from 1930 to 1939, and 15 matches for the Netherlands national football team from 1932 to 1940, and participated in the 1934 FIFA World Cup and the 1938 FIFA World Cup.

References

1910 births
1990 deaths
1934 FIFA World Cup players
1938 FIFA World Cup players
Association football goalkeepers
Dutch footballers
Feyenoord players
Netherlands international footballers
People from Terneuzen
Footballers from Zeeland